Borut Mačkovšek (born 11 September 1992) is a Slovenian handball player who plays for SC Pick Szeged and the Slovenian national team.

He represented Slovenia at the 2013 World Men's Handball Championship and at the 2012 European Men's Handball Championship.

References

External links

1992 births
Living people
Sportspeople from Koper
Slovenian male handball players
Expatriate handball players
Slovenian expatriate sportspeople in Belarus
Slovenian expatriate sportspeople in France
Slovenian expatriate sportspeople in Germany
Slovenian expatriate sportspeople in Hungary
Handball-Bundesliga players
Montpellier Handball players
Veszprém KC players
SC Pick Szeged players
21st-century Slovenian people